Technopark Zürich is a research park known as technopark based in the municipality of Zürich in the Canton of Zürich in Switzerland.

History 
Technopark Zürich was established in 1993. The founders planned to provide rooms, offices and other spaces for people from various branches, disciplines, universities, research institutes, start-ups and established enterprises.

Organisation 
Technopark Zürich is managed as a privately funded foundation, and the property landlords are Swiss Life and Zürcher Kantonalbank. The foundation has two major divisions. One division is responsible for the real estate, handling all tenancy and facility management activities, including the lease of rooms for events. The other division is concerned with the actual foundation affairs to increase the competitiveness of the Swiss economy and to create enduring jobs.

Collaborations 
Technopark has numerous strategic collaborative partners to facilitate the transfer of knowledge and technology and the development of start-up companies: Centre Suisse d’Électronique et de Microtechnique (CSEM), CTI-Start-up, Division of Business and Economic Development of the Canton of Zürich, EMPA Dübendorf, ETH Zurich, FHS St.Gallen, glaTec, Greater Zurich Area, International Association of Science Parks (IASP), Swissparks, University of St. Gallen, University of Zurich, venturelab and Zurich University of Applied Sciences (ZHAW). Technopark-Alliance was founded in 2002 to provide technology from academia to practice. The Technoparks in Aargau, Lugano, Luzern, Schlieren, Winterthur, Liechtenstein (Vaduz), Landquart and Zürich are members of the Technopark-Alliance.

Location 
Technopark is located in the Industriequartier district of the city of Zürich. It houses around 300 companies and organizations of the fields of science, technology and economy, among them ETH Zürich, Swiss Post logistics and digitec, at its 47,000 m² site.

The Technopark building complex was built between 1989 and 1993 as the first large single building on the industrial site of the former Escher Wyss & Cie company, and triggered the overall planning of the 17-hectare site. The project relied on the private design plan Techno Park (1991) and to the private design plan Escher Wyss area (1995/99). In 2011 the city council of Zürich authorized the partial revision of the design plan, and in 2012 the middle section of the building was increased.

References 

Science parks in Switzerland
Swiss companies established in 1993
Buildings and structures in Zürich